Hamrah Dom is a small village in Upper Egypt. It is situated near the city of Qena, about 80 kilometres north-west of Luxor.

Overview
Located on the west bank of the Nile in the Qena Governorate. It is known for being near the Jabal al-Tarif cliff 
 in which the Gnostic Gospels of the Nag Hammadi library were found  by Mohammed Ali Samman in December 1945. Known to have been inhabited by the Hawara tribe at least during the period prior to and including 1945.

See also
Nag Hammadi library
Nag Hammâdi

References

External links
  Nag Hammadi library ( article with  five photographs and a  map) retrieve 00:14(UTC), 16 December 2007

Populated places in Qena Governorate